Johannes Vares (pen name Barbarus or Vares-Barbarus  – 29 November 1946) was an Estonian and Soviet poet, medical doctor, and politician.

Vares was born in a farmer family in the village of Kiisa, near Viljandi, Estonia. He received secondary education at Pärnu Gymnasium, and in 1910–1914 studied medicine at the University of Kyiv.

Vares served as a military physician in World War I, and after that as a military physician for the Estonian Army during the Estonian War of Independence (1918–1920). He was awarded the Estonian Cross of Liberty for the participation.

In the 1920s, Vares started working as a medical doctor in Pärnu. He subsequently became a well-known poet as well as a radical socialist, using the pen name Johannes Barbarus.

During World War II, after the Stalinist Soviet Union invaded and occupied Estonia in June 1940, Andrei Zhdanov, leader of the Soviet agression, forced the Estonian president Konstantin Päts to appoint Vares as prime minister of a communist-dominated puppet government. Päts resigned in July 1940, and Vares formally took over most presidential duties. The puppet government declared Estonia a "Soviet Socialist Republic" (SSR), and Vares remained nominal head of state for a few weeks more as chairman of the Supreme Soviet of the Estonian SSR. He headed the delegation to Moscow on 6 August 1940 that petitioned to Stalin and the Soviet central government to incorporate Estonia into the Soviet Union — an act that has tainted Vares as a traitor to the majority of Estonian people. On 12 September 1940, Vares became member of the Central Committee of the Communist Party of Estonia, soon after the party had been merged into the All-Union Communist Party (bolsheviks) of the USSR.

Following the German invasion of Estonia in 1941, Vares fled to Soviet Russia, where he lived in exile from 1941 to 1944, until the Soviets reconquered Estonia.

On 20 April 1944, the Electoral Committee of the Republic of Estonia (the institution specified in the Constitution for electing the Acting President of the Republic) held a clandestine meeting in Tallinn. The participants included Jüri Uluots, the last Prime Minister of Estonia before the Soviet occupation, the substitute for Commander-in-Chief of the Armed Forces Johan Holberg, the chairman of the Chamber of Deputies Otto Pukk, the second deputy vice-chairman of the National Council Alfred Maurer, and State judge Mihkel Klaassen. The Committee declared Päts' appointment of Vares as Prime Minister had been illegal. Accordingly, it held that Uluots had assumed the President's duties from 21 June 1940 onwards.

The Estonian government has maintained that all laws, decrees and treaties made in 1940–1941 in Soviet-occupied Estonia, including those of Vares' puppet government, illegal, null and void from their start. The upper house of Parliament had been dissolved soon after the 16–17 June 1940 Soviet invasion and was never reconvened, nor re-elected. According to the then Constitution of Estonia, all laws had to pass both houses of parliament before being promulgated. This applies also to the new pro-Soviet 1940 "electoral law" under which the blatantly rigged elections of 14–15 July 1940 were conducted. It was this sham election that produced the so-called "People's Parliament" which then declared Estonia a "Soviet republic" and "requested" to join the Soviet Union.

After returning to Estonia in 1944, Vares came under investigation by the Soviet NKVD for his activities in the Estonian War of Independence (1918–1920). He committed suicide in presidential residence in Kadriorg, Tallinn, in November 1946.

See also
Johannes Vares' cabinet

Citations and references

Cited sources

External links
 Johannes Vares at Estonian Writers' Online Dictionary

1890 births
1946 suicides
People from Viljandi Parish
People from Kreis Fellin
Members of the Central Committee of the Communist Party of Estonia
Heads of state of the Estonian Soviet Socialist Republic
Prime Ministers of Estonia
Members of the Supreme Soviet of the Estonian Soviet Socialist Republic, 1940–1947
First convocation members of the Soviet of the Union
Estonian male poets
20th-century Estonian poets
Estonian military doctors
Soviet military doctors
Taras Shevchenko National University of Kyiv alumni
Russian military personnel of World War I
Estonian military personnel of the Estonian War of Independence
Recipients of the Order of St. Anna, 4th class
Recipients of the Order of Saint Stanislaus (Russian), 3rd class
Recipients of the Cross of Liberty (Estonia)
Recipients of the Order of Lenin
Suicides by firearm in Estonia
Estonian politicians who committed suicide
Soviet politicians who committed suicide
People from Pärnu